Bharathi Kannama is a 1997 Indian Tamil-language drama film directed by Cheran, starring R. Parthiban and Meena. The film marks Cheran's debut as a director and screenwriter. It was well-received upon its commercial release. Prabhu Solomon remade this film in Kannada as Usire (2001) with Ravichandran.

Plot 
The protagonist is a landlord in Devar Palayam. In a community where wealthy landlords do not normally engage in unskilled labor, he does his own chores to make a social statement that all castes are equal.

In a flashback; Bharathi (Parthiban) is a lower caste worker for a rich landlord, Vellaisamy Thevar (Vijayakumar). He saves Vellaisamy's daughter Kanamma (Meena) at a local fair, and she falls in love with him. Bharathi's sister, Pechi (Indhu), accompanies him to the fair and wants some anklets that Bharati cannot afford. Kanamma waits until everyone leaves after dinner and then gives Pechi some anklets. This is seen by Bharati, who is actually in love with her but does not reciprocate her feelings due to his loyalty towards Vellaisamy. Pechi settles with a higher-caste landlord's son living in the next village.

Vellaisamy thinks of getting his daughter married and finds a suitable candidate. On the day of the ponnu paarkura, a fire starts, and the groom's family views the union to be unfavorable. Afterward, Kanamma's burns are treated by Bharati, and she writes a letter about her love for him, but his name is obscured by her tears. The letter is discovered by her father, who attacks his daughter and tries to discover who she loves. Bharati later tells Kanamma that their relationship cannot happen due to caste differences.  Vellaisamy's mother has a heart attack, and her last wish is to see Kanamma married. He consults astrologers who assure him of a match, while Kanamma remains depressed. When Bharathi is escorting some of his master's goods through a forest, he is stopped by Maayan, who has heard of Kanamma's marriage and vows to stop it.

Kanamma makes the goat sacrifice, and Bharati encourages her to accept her new husband, though he does so with great regret. During the sacrifice of the goat, Kanamma hallucinates that she led Bharati before her father and killed him. Throughout the preparations for the wedding, Bharati does not speak to Kanamma.

Pechi returns home and scolds Bharati for neglecting Kanamma. She tells Bharati to stop Kanamma from potentially killing herself, and he runs to her. Maayan and his gang come to the village and attack Bharati, who defeats them. However, he cannot stop Kanamma from committing suicide. He beats the parai at her funeral, unable to speak. After Vellaisamy is guided to light the torch, and all go to bathe in the river, Bharati throws himself on Kanamma's funeral pyre and burns with her. Vellaisamy realized that bharati was the person kannamma was in love with, but did not tell him due to caste problems. Vellaisamy tells to himself that bharati setting himself on pyre is symbolic representation of their love, and the other villagers grieve again for Bharati, and Vellaisamy adopts Pechi(bharati's sister), marries her to her high-caste lover, and sends them to the city.

Years later, Vellaisamy greets Pechi, her husband, and their children at the railway station forgetting about caste and discrimination of villagers.

Cast

Soundtrack 
The music of the movie was composed by Deva.

Controversy 
Upon release, the film was almost banned due to its caste-subversive content. As a result, some releases had deleted scenes, and in Rajapalayam the film was not immediately released.

References

External links 
 
 Film review

1997 films
1997 directorial debut films
1990s Tamil-language films
Discrimination in fiction
Films about the caste system in India
Films about social class
Films directed by Cheran
Films scored by Deva (composer)
Tamil films remade in other languages